Ischnocnema holti is a species of frog in the family Brachycephalidae. It is endemic to the state of Rio de Janeiro, Brazil, and is known from the Serra da Mantiqueira in Itatiaia and Serra dos Órgãos in Teresópolis. Common name Holt's robber frog has been coined for this species.

Description
Adult males measure  and females  in snout–vent length. The habitus is robust. The head is wider than long. The snout is rounded. The tympanum is distinct. The dorsum is smooth to granular, with small granulations on the sides. Discs on fingers and toes are well-developed. The dorsal coloration is variable: uniformly dark brown or gray, exhibiting green or irregularly distributed red spots, sometimes with two dark longitudinal bands running from the eyes to the posterior region, or light green with brown spots.

Habitat and conservation
Ischnocnema holti inhabits forests, ravines, and high-altitude grasslands. In Serra dos Órgãos it occurs above . Males call from vegetation up to 4 m above the ground.

The species is present in the Itatiaia National Park, where its type locality lies, as well as in the Serra dos Órgãos National Park. It is abundant in both locations.

References

holti
Endemic fauna of Brazil
Amphibians of Brazil
Taxa named by Doris Mable Cochran
Amphibians described in 1948
Taxonomy articles created by Polbot